Gregory John Dayman (born 21 February 1945 in Wellington) is a former New Zealand field hockey player who was a member of the national team that won the molden medal at the 1976 Summer Olympics in Montreal.

Dayman made his debut for the Black Sticks in 1969 and was a regular feature for New Zealand over the next decade, participating as vice captain in the 1972 Munich Olympics where they finished 9th and going on to win gold at the 1976 Olympics in Montreal. He was named captain of the 1980 Olympic team, however New Zealand boycotted the games that year.

References

External links
 

New Zealand male field hockey players
New Zealand field hockey coaches
Olympic field hockey players of New Zealand
Field hockey players at the 1972 Summer Olympics
Field hockey players at the 1976 Summer Olympics
Olympic gold medalists for New Zealand
Field hockey players from Wellington City
1947 births
Living people
Olympic medalists in field hockey
Medalists at the 1976 Summer Olympics